Saiyada Khatoon is an Indian politician and Samajwadi Party member of the Uttar Pradesh Legislative Assembly from Domariyaganj since 2022.

On 10 March 2022, after winning the election, Khatoon and 200 Samajwadi Party members were named in a first information report regarding the use of pro-Pakistan slogans, allegations he denied.

References 
 

Samajwadi Party politicians from Uttar Pradesh
Year of birth missing (living people)
Uttar Pradesh MLAs 2022–2027
People from Siddharthnagar district
Living people